Garraway Hotel is a hotel located on the quayside of Roseau, Dominica. It lies between the Fort Young Hotel (to the east) and right next to The Dominica Museum (to the west). In the colonial period this area was part of the Fort Young from 1770. This hotel was built in 1994. Located in a mint green and white building, the five-storey hotel contains 31 rooms and is operated by the Garraway family. The hotel contains an interior courtyard, rooftop terrace, the Balisier Creole cuisine restaurant on the second floor, a duty-free shop on the ground floor and the Ole Jetty Bar.
The rooms are fitted with king-sized beds or double beds, with rattan furniture and floral-print fabrics.

See also
 List of hotels in the Caribbean

References

External links
Official site

Hotel buildings completed in 1994
Hotels established in 1994
Hotels in Dominica
Roseau
1994 establishments in Dominica